Avila University  is a private Roman Catholic university in Kansas City, Missouri. It is sponsored by the Sisters of St. Joseph of Carondelet and offers bachelor's degrees and master's degrees. The school enrolled 1,527 students in 2019.

History
In 1916, on the same campus at 5600 Main Street as St. Teresa's Academy, the Sisters of St. Joseph of Carondelet founded the College of Saint Teresa. St. Teresa's College was founded as a two-year college for women only. The first graduates of St. Teresa's College received their degrees in 1918.

In 1939, Kansas City Bishop Edwin O'Hara announced that St. Teresa's junior college would be expanded to a full four-year college, and the college would be housed in its own building on the campus. In 1940, ground was broken for Donnelly Hall, and it opened for classes in 1941. The first four-year graduating class received their degrees in 1942. In 1948, the college established a department of nursing, offering both a three-year diploma and a four-year bachelor of nursing degree.

In May 1961, Sister Mary Daniel Tammany, president of the College of St. Teresa, announced the purchase of 49 acres of land for a new campus at 119th and Wornall Road in the Red Bridge neighborhood near the southern edge of Kansas City, Missouri. The high school, St. Teresa's Academy, is still operating on the original site. At the groundbreaking for the first building on the new campus, the announcement was made that the college would be renamed Avila College, still in honor of Saint Teresa of Avila. In 1969 Avila began admitting male students, and in 1978, the college began offering graduate programs in business, education, and psychology. Avila College became Avila University in July 2002.

Student body
Of the 1,710 students attending Avila University in the fall of 2016, females outnumber males 62 percent to 38 percent. 57 percent of students are Caucasian, 20 percent are African-American, 10 percent international, and eight percent Hispanic. 20 percent are Catholic. The average ACT score of the incoming freshman class is 23. About 31% of students live on campus.

Academics
Avila University is divided into three colleges. Each College has a collection of Schools for the various programs:
 College of Liberal Arts & Social Sciences
 School of Humanities
 School of Performing Arts
 School of Psychology
 School of Social Sciences
 College of Science & Health
 School of Natural and Applied Sciences
 School of Computer Sciences & Mathematics
 School of Imaging Sciences
 School of Nursing
 College of Professional Schools
 School of Business
 School of Education
 School of Visual and Communication Arts
 Avila Institute for Professional Studies

Campus

There are 13 buildings that include four residence halls, a fieldhouse, theatre, student union, library, as well as academic buildings. The campus is easily accessed from I-435 and sits close to the Missouri-Kansas border.

Student life
Student life at Avila is quite active with more than 40 student organizations available to the student body, including the Student Senate, Group Activities Programming, Black Student Union, Student Social Work Association, Residence Hall Association, Campus Ministries, and numerous academic organizations and honor societies.

Avila University currently does not have any fraternities or sororities on campus. In the mid-1990s, Avila had a chapter of Alpha Kappa Lambda fraternity and a chapter of Alpha Phi sorority; however, as a result of poor support from the university administration, both Greek chapters closed shortly before the college achieved university status.

Residential life
Carondelet Hall was the first residence hall built at the current Avila University location. Carondelet houses up to 122 students at its maximum capacity. In the summer of 2005, the first two floors of the hall were renovated to fit the more modern version of a residence hall. In the summer of 2007, the third floor was also renovated.

Ridgway Hall was built only a few years after Carondelet Hall, and has the same floor plan and room dimensions. In the summer of 2008, all three floors in Ridgway were renovated in a similar manner as Carondelet.

Jeanne Collins Thompson Hall opened in the fall of 2007. The 29,000 square foot Thompson Hall features three floors of suite-style housing with each suite containing four bedrooms, two bathrooms, living room, and kitchenette. The facility houses 65 students and staff in the 16 suites.

In fall 2012, Avila celebrated the opening of its fourth residence hall, Avila Hall (later dedicated as Glenna Wylie Hall), a 39,000 square foot three-story residence hall on the northeast edge of campus. The residence hall features suite style living arrangements, and it increased Avila's capacity to allow up to 390 students living on campus.

Athletics

The Avila athletic teams are called the Eagles (formerly known as the "Avalanche" until 1990). The university is a member of the National Association of Intercollegiate Athletics (NAIA), primarily competing in the Kansas Collegiate Athletic Conference (KCAC) since the 2018–19 academic year. The Eagles previously competed in the Heart of America Athletic Conference (HAAC) from 2000–01 to 2017–18; as well as in the defunct Midlands Collegiate Athletic Conference (MCAC) from 1994–95 to 1999–2000.

Avila competes in 14 intercollegiate varsity sports: Men's sports include baseball, basketball, bowling, football, soccer and wrestling; while women's sports include basketball, bowling, soccer, softball, volleyball and wrestling. Avila also has award-winning cheerleading and dance teams.

History
In 1999, Avila announced the addition of intercollegiate football to the athletic program, and the sport began its first season of competition in the fall of 2001.

In 2011, the athletic complex was expanded to provide facilities for football and soccer games to be played on campus. A 194,000 square foot multi-purpose athletic field was constructed, featuring a Shaw Sportexe Legion synthetic turf system. The field included a new press box, new bleachers, and a Daktronics scoreboard. Avila's football team played its first on campus game on September 17, 2011, against Missouri Valley College. In the 2020-2021 fall season, the Avila football team, led by coach Marc Benavidez, won their first conference championship by winning their final 8 games of the season.

References

External links
 
 Avila Athletics website

Private universities and colleges in Missouri
Universities and colleges in Kansas City, Missouri
Sisters of Saint Joseph colleges and universities
Educational institutions established in 1916
Association of Catholic Colleges and Universities
Catholic universities and colleges in Missouri
Roman Catholic Diocese of Kansas City–Saint Joseph
1916 establishments in Missouri
Former Midlands Collegiate Athletic Conference schools
Former women's universities and colleges in the United States